Odabaşı is a village in the Nusaybin District of Mardin Province in Turkey. The village is populated by Assyrians and by Kurds of the Mizizex and Omerkan tribes. It had a population of 686 in 2021.

History 
The village had 800 Turoyo-speakers in the 1960s.

References 

Villages in Nusaybin District
Kurdish settlements in Mardin Province
Assyrian communities in Turkey